Don Bosco is a Panama Metro station on Line 2. It was opened on 25 April 2019 as part of the inaugural section of Line 2 between San Miguelito and Nuevo Tocumen. This is an elevated station built next to Avenida Domingo Díaz. The station is located between Pedregal and Corredor Sur.

References

Panama Metro stations
2019 establishments in Panama
Railway stations opened in 2019